Change Up the Groove is a studio album by Roy Ayers Ubiquity. It was released in 1974 through Polydor Records. Recording sessions for the album took place at Electric Lady Studios in New York City. The album peaked at number 156 on the Billboard 200 albums chart.

Track listing

Personnel 
 Roy Ayers – vocals, vibraphone, arrangement
 Wayne Garfield – vocals, arrangement (tracks: 2, 8)
 James "BJ" Boston – backing vocals
 Monica Burruss – backing vocals
 Terry Burrell – backing vocals
 Harry Whitaker – electric piano, clavinet, piano
 Leon Pendarvis – electric piano, clavinet, piano
 Pat Rebillot – ARP synthesizer
 Calvin Brown – guitar
 Gil Silva – rhythm guitar
 Jerry M. Friedman – rhythm guitar
 Wilbur Bascomb Jr. – bass
 Wilby Fletcher – drums
 Bernard Lee "Pretty" Purdie – drums
 Chano O'Ferral – congas, percussion
 George Braith – sopranino saxophone
Technical
 Jerry Schoenbaum – producer
 Ron Johnsen – recording
 Harriet Millman – artwork
 Greg Vaughn – photography
 Yvonne D. Lawton – photography

Chart history

References

External links 

1974 albums
Roy Ayers albums
Polydor Records albums
Albums recorded at Electric Lady Studios